Brian Philip Isherwood (born  18 June 1946) is a New Zealand cricketer who played for the Canterbury in the Plunket Shield and for Mid Canterbury in the Hawke Cup. He was a specialist wicketkeeper. In 1971-72 he and Cran Bull added 184* for Canterbury against Central Districts at Trafalgar Park, Nelson.

References

1946 births
Living people
New Zealand cricketers
Canterbury cricketers